The sinking of the Titanic was one of the deadliest maritime disasters in history.

Sinking of the Titanic may also refer to:

 The Sinking of the Titanic (Bryars), 1972 minimalist composition
 The Sinking of the Titanic and Great Sea Disasters, 1912 book by Logan Marshall
 Der Untergang der Titanic, 1978 poem by Hans Magnus Enzensberger
 Der Untergang der Titanic, 1979 operatic adaptation by  Wilhelm Dieter Siebert

See also
 Titanic in popular culture